Caponiidae is a family of ecribellate haplogyne spiders that are unusual in a number of ways. They differ from other spiders in lacking book lungs and having the posterior median spinnerets anteriorly displaced to form a transverse row with the anterior lateral spinnerets. Most species have only two eyes, which is also unusual among spiders. A few species of Caponiidae variously have four, six or eight eyes. In some species the number of eyes will increase when the spiderling changes its skin as it grows towards adulthood.

Description
The carapace (cephalothorax or prosoma) is orange and the abdomen (opisthosoma) light gray. The two-eyed species have their two eyes in the anterior middle of the carapace.

Eye numbers
Caponiidae are unusual in the degree to which the eye number varies. In this they surpass even the family Cybaeidae in which some species have two eyes, some six, and some eight. In some species of the Caponiidae paired eyes meet in the midline, giving the spider in effect, an odd number of eyes.  The following genera have eyes as follows:
 Eight eyes: Calponia, Caponia (but latter may also have two, three, four or 'five' eyes)
 Six eyes: Iraponia
 Four eyes: Nopsides, Notnops
 Two eyes: Cubanops, Diplogena, Laoponia, Medionops, Nops, Nopsma, Nyetnops, Orthonops, Taintnops, Tarsonnops, Tisentnops.

Habits
Their habits are for the most part unknown. At least some species are known to hunt other spiders.

Relationships
The fact that they are ecribellate and haplogyne suggests that they might be relatively primitive. Calponia harrisonfordi from California seems to be the most primitive member of the family.  Their phylogenetic relationships have long been enigmatic, but in the early 1990s it was determined that they are probably a sister group of the Tetrablemmidae plus the four families inside the superfamily Dysderoidea.

The subfamily Nopinae consists at least of the genera Nops, Nopsides, Orthonops and Tarsonops. The remaining genera are unlikely to form a monophyletic group.

Distribution
The family is found in Africa and the Americas from Argentina to the United States.

Names
Calponia is a contraction of Californian Caponia, because the single species Calponia harrisonfordi has, like the African genus Caponia eight eyes. The species name is in honor of Harrison Ford, recognizing his efforts on behalf of the American Museum of Natural History.

The Chilean caponiid fauna differs from that of the rest of the Neotropics in lacking members of the Nopinae (named after the genus Nops). Three genera newly described by Norman I. Platnick in 1994 were thus named Notnops, Taintnops and Tisentnops, emphasizing this fact. The only Taintnops species, T. goloboffi, is named in honor of one of the collectors, P.A. Goloboff.

Genera

, the World Spider Catalog accepts the following genera:

Calponia Platnick, 1993 — United States
Caponia Simon, 1887 — Africa
Caponina Simon, 1892 — South America, Caribbean, Central America
Carajas Brescovit & Sánchez-Ruiz, 2016 — Brazil
Cubanops Sánchez-Ruiz, Platnick & Dupérré, 2010 — Cuba
Diploglena Purcell, 1904 — South Africa, Namibia, Botswana
Iraponia Kranz-Baltensperger, Platnick & Dupérré, 2009
Laoponia Platnick & Jäger, 2008 — Laos, Vietnam
Medionops Sánchez-Ruiz & Brescovit, 2017 — South America, Panama, Trinidad
Nasutonops Brescovit & Sánchez-Ruiz, 2016 — Brazil
Nops MacLeay, 1839 — South America, Mexico, Central America, Caribbean
Nopsides Chamberlin, 1924 — Mexico
Nopsma Sánchez-Ruiz, Brescovit, Bonaldo 2020 — South America, Mexico, Central America
Notnops Platnick, 1994 — Chile
Nyetnops Platnick & Lise, 2007 — Brazil, Ecuador
Orthonops Chamberlin, 1924 — United States, Mexico
Taintnops Platnick, 1994 — Chile
Tarsonops Chamberlin, 1924 — Cuba, Central America, Mexico
Tisentnops Platnick, 1994 — Chile, Brazil

See also
 List of Caponiidae species

References

 Kranz-Baltensperger, Y., N. Platnick & N. Dupérré (2009). A new genus of the spider family Caponiidae (Araneae, Haplogynae) from Iran. American Museum Novitates, 3656 :1-12. 
 Platnick, N.I. (1993) A New Genus of the Spider Family Caponiidae (Araneae, Haplogynae) from California. American Museum Novitates 3063. PDF (Calponia)
 Platnick, N.I. (1994). A Revision of the Spider Genus Caponina (Araneae, Caponiidae). American Museum Novitates 3100.
 Platnick, N.I. (1994). A Review of the Chilean Spiders of the Family Caponiidae (Araneae, Haplogynae). American Museum Novitates 3113. PDF
 Platnick, N.I. (1995). A revision of the spider genus Orthonops (Araneae, Caponiidae). American Museum Novitates 3150. PDF (five new species)
 Platnick, N.I. & P. Jager (2008). On the first Asian spiders of the family Caponiidae (Araneae, Haplogynae), with notes on the African genus Diploglena. American Museum Novitates, 3634: 1-12. 
 Platnick, N.I. & A. Lise (2007). On Nyetnops, a new genus of the spider subfamily Nopinae (Araneae, Caponiidae) from Brazil. American Museum Novitates, 3595:1-9. 
 Sánchez-Ruiz, A., N.I. Platnick, and N. Dupérré (2010). A new genus of the spider family Caponiidae (Araneae, Haplogynae) from the West Indies. American Museum Novitates 3705: 1–44.

External links

 Picture of unidentified caponiid
 

 
Araneomorphae families